The Belfast SNL Giants are an amateur ice hockey team from Belfast, Northern Ireland, who compete in the Scottish National League (SNL). They are an affiliate of the Elite Ice Hockey League’s Belfast Giants.

Club roster 2020–21

2020/21 Outgoing

Team staff
 Head Coach – Rob Stewart / Mark Morrison
 General Manager – Paul Robinson

Affiliated teams
 Belfast Junior Giants (Scotland U18)
 Belfast Giants (EIHL)

References

External links
 
 

 
Ice hockey teams in the United Kingdom
Ice hockey teams in Ireland
Sports teams in Northern Ireland
Ice hockey in Northern Ireland
Sports clubs in Belfast
Sports clubs in County Antrim
Ice hockey clubs established in 2007
2007 establishments in Northern Ireland